Erkenek Dam is a dam and hydroelectric plant in Adıyaman Province, southeastern Turkey.

It is a small plant owned by Tektuğ Company. Its nominal power is 13 MW and the total annual energy output is about 52 GWh. The plant provides sufficient electricity for about 12,422 households.

References

Dams in Adıyaman Province
Hydroelectric power stations in Turkey